Thyestes is a lost tragedy by Euripides.  The play may have concerned the myth of Thyestes' seduction of Aerope, the wife of his brother Atreus, and Atreus' subsequent revenge on Thyestes, killing his children and serving them to him at a feast.

References

External links 
 Fragmenta

Further reading 
 Euripides: Fragments edd. Christopher Collard, Martin Cropp (Cantabrigiae [Mass.]: Harvard University Press, 2008) vol. 1 pp. 428-437 (Loeb Classical Library)
 Tragicorum Graecorum fragmenta. 2a ed., vol. 5: Euripides ed. E. C. Kopff. Goettingae 2004.

Plays by Euripides
Lost plays
Plays based on classical mythology